Zelemkhan Magomedovich Zangiyev (27 May 1974 – 14 January 2012, Vladikavkaz, Russia) was a Russian professional football player.

Club career
He made his Russian Football National League debut for FC Angusht Nazran on 5 April 2006 in a game against FC Kuban Krasnodar. That was his only season in the FNL.

References

External links
 

1974 births
2012 deaths
Russian footballers
FC Angusht Nazran players
Association football midfielders
Association football forwards
Sportspeople from Vladikavkaz